Tsao Kiang was a 640-ton wooden (according to other sources: 600-ton composite-hulled) gunboat, launched in 1869 by Jiangnan Shipyard, Shanghai, for the Nanyang Fleet. Acquired in 1872 for Zhili Province by Li Hongzhang the ship served with Beiyang Fleet as a governor's yacht.

During the opening naval battle of the First Sino-Japanese War, Tsao Kiang was captured by the Imperial Japanese Navy cruiser  during the Battle of Pungdo on 25 July 1894. Commissioned into the Japanese Navy as a prize of war on 21 September 1894, it was used as a patrol boat along the coastline of Korea during the remainder of that conflict. The ship was renamed Sōkō, based on the Japanese pronunciation of her original name. On 21 March 1898, Sōkō was de-rated to a second-class gunboat, and was used for surveys of the Kurile Islands in Japan's northern waters. On 22 May 1903, Sōkō ran aground in Muroran harbor, but was refloated on 9 July. On 26 October, the vessel was transferred from the Imperial Japanese Navy to the control of the Japanese Home Ministry, and was used as a guard boat in Kobe. In 1924, it was sold off by the Japanese government to a private buyer in Nishinomiya, Hyogo and continued to be used as a civilian transport under the name Sōkō Maru until 1964.

Notes

References

Ships built in China
Tsao-kiang
First Sino-Japanese War naval ships of China
Gunboats of the Imperial Japanese Navy
First Sino-Japanese War naval ships of Japan
1876 ships
Captured ships
Naval ships of China